Gregorio (Flores) Luque (born 9 May 1942 in Nogales, Sonora, México) played and managed in the Mexican League, the highest level of professional baseball in Mexico. Elected to the Mexican Baseball Hall of Fame in 1999, he managed from 1976 to 1994. He played in the 1960s.

References

External links

1942 births
Living people
Mexican Baseball Hall of Fame inductees
Minor league baseball players
Minor league baseball managers